Astrothelium flavomeristosporum is a species of corticolous (bark-dwelling),  crustose lichen in the family Trypetheliaceae. Found in Ecuador and the Philippines, it was formally described as a new species in 2016 by Dutch lichenologist André Aptroot. The type specimen was collected by American botanist Edward Elmer from Irosin (Sorsogon, Luzon), in 1916. The lichen has a smooth and somewhat shiny, greyish-green thallus with a cortex surrounded by a thin (0.1 mm wide) black prothallus line. No lichen products were detected in the species using thin-layer chromatography. The main characteristics of the lichen distinguishing it from others in Astrothelium are its smooth to uneven thallus, its prominent, blackish, and exposed ascomata, and its yellow .

References

flavomeristosporum
Lichen species
Lichens described in 2016
Lichens of Ecuador
Lichens of Malesia
Taxa named by André Aptroot